Scott Law (born 9 March 1991) is an Australian racing cyclist, who currently rides for Australian amateur team Marconi Cycling Club. He rode at the 2015 UCI Track Cycling World Championships.

Major results
2016
 7th White Spot / Delta Road Race
2017
 3rd White Spot / Delta Road Race

References

External links

1991 births
Living people
Australian male cyclists
Cyclists from Sydney